ANAPROF 2002 is the 2002 season of the Panamanian football league, ANAPROF.  The season started on March 17, 2002 with the Torneo Apertura 2002 and finalized on November 24, 2002 with the Torneo Clausura 2002. The Apertura champion was Árabe Unido and the Clausura champion was Plaza Amador, on November 30, 2002 the ANAPROF 2002 final was played and Plaza Amador was crowned champion over Deportivo Árabe Unido.

Change for 2002
There will be no relegation because the Primera A championship was not played in 2002.
In the 2002 Apertura, the teams were divided into two groups where the top two teams of each group will play a two-leg semifinal and a single final match.
For the 2002 Clausura the two groups format was abandoned and replaced with a single aggregate table format where the top four teams will participate in for a pair of home-and-away series. The top two teams of this cuadrangular series will play a home and away final match.
For the Apertura championship Sporting '89 changed its name to Sporting San Miguelito. Ando for the Clausura championship Sporting San Miguelito were renamed Sporting Coclé after they re-located to Antón Coclé.

Teams 

[*] From the Clausura championship, Sporting San Miguelito re-located themselves to the Coclé Province.

Apertura 2002

Standings

Group A

Group B

Results table

Final round

Semifinals 1st Leg

Semifinals 2nd Leg

Árabe Unido advances to final 4-2 on penalties

San Francisco advances to final 4-2 on penalties

Final

Top goal scorer

Clausura 2002

Standings

Results table

Final round

Cuadrangular semifinal

Final 1st Leg

Final 2nd Leg

Plaza Amador won 1-4 on penalties

Top goal scorer

ANAPROF 2002 grand final

Final

Local derby statistics

El Super Clasico Nacional - Tauro v Plaza Amador

Clasico del Pueblo - Plaza Amador v El Chorillo

References
RSSF ANAPROF 2002

ANAPROF seasons
1
Pan
1
Pan